CompeteFor is a website set up by the Regional Development Agencies of the United Kingdom to facilitate the awarding of public contracts to business. The CompeteFor service was launched on January 17, 2008.

The service is available to all businesses, but the emphasis is on the support of small and medium-sized enterprises (SMEs).

Notes

External links

Government procurement in the United Kingdom
Internet properties established in 2008